Wafd, WaFd, or WAFD may refer to:

 Washington Federal, or WaFd Bank
 New Wafd Party, an Egyptian political party (1978–present)
 Wafd Party, an Egyptian political party (1918–1952)
 WAFD, a radio station